Pouzolles is a commune in the Hérault department in the Occitanie region in southern France.

Activities 
The village has a small collection of a few shops (bakery, superette, tobacconist), a pizzeria and chambres d'hôtes, or gîtes. These come along with various other activities, such as a post office, a nearby paintball, a seasonal gallery and of course the local wines.

Sights 
 the château (see on pictures).

 the village center, built as a circulade.

Population

See also 
 Communes of the Hérault department

References

External links

 Official website 
 Coteaux et Châteaux website 

Communes of Hérault